Daniel Horace Deudney (born March 9, 1953) is an American political scientist and Professor of Political Science at Johns Hopkins University. His published work is mainly in the fields of international relations and political theory, with an emphasis on geopolitics and republicanism.

Education
Deudney graduated from Yale University in 1975 with a Bachelor of Arts in political science and philosophy. He holds an MPA in science, technology, and public policy from the George Washington University. In 1989, he graduated from Princeton University with an MA and PhD in political science.

Career
In the late 1970s, Deudney worked for three years as the senior legislative assistant for energy and environment and legislative director to Senator John A. Durkin (D-NH). In the 1980s, he was a senior researcher at the Worldwatch Institute in Washington D.C.  He also consulted for the Departments of State and Defense and the Central Intelligence Agency.

From 1991 to 1998, Deudney taught at the University of Pennsylvania, as an assistant professor before he accepted a position as associate professor at Johns Hopkins University.

He has won several awards for teaching including the Johns Hopkins University Alumni Association Excellence in Teaching Award in 2005, the George E. Owens Teaching Award in 2001, and Penn's Lindback Award for excellence in teaching in 1996.

Deudney's book, Bounding Power: Republican Security Theory from the Polis to the Global Village, is revolutionary in its field, as he seeks to carry out a profound critique of realism and liberalism. He argues that realism and liberalism are both fragments of a broader tradition of republican thought. In contrast to either realism or liberalism, republican political thought is focused on negotiating the space between anarchy and hierarchy. The book was reviewed in March/April 2007 issue of Foreign Affairs. It received the 2008 Robert Jervis and Paul Schroeder Award for the Best Book on International History and Politics, International History and Politics Section, American Political Science Association, and the 2010 ISA Book of the Decade Award in International Studies, International Studies Association.Bounding Power

Overall, Deudney remains a liberal theorist, describing liberalism as "not the enemy of republican security theory, but its privileged... child". He believes the liberal democratic model will prevail in the world, and without believing in the triumphalism of Francis Fukuyama's thesis, he paraphrases him: "Liberal states should not assume that history has ended, but they can still be certain that it is on their side."

Works

Books

Dissertation

Articles
 
Deudney, Daniel. "Publius before Kant: Federal-Republican Security and Democratic Peace." European Journal of International Relations. London: Sep 2004. Vol.10, Iss. 3;  p. 315

See also

Relevant concepts
Negarchy
Geopolitics

Other republican IR theorists
Nicholas Onuf
Andrew Price-Smith
Steven Slaughter

References

External links

 Theory Talks 2013 interview with Daniel Deudney
 Video of debate/discussion with Deudney and Michael Lind on Bloggingheads.tv
  
  

American political scientists
International relations scholars
Johns Hopkins University faculty
Yale College alumni
Elliott School of International Affairs alumni
Princeton University alumni
1953 births
Living people